Buhle Mkhwanazi (born 1 February 1990 in Bloemfontein) is a South African soccer player who last played as a centre-back or defensive midfielder for SuperSport United in the Premier Soccer League.

Career statistics

International

References

1990 births
South African soccer players
Living people
Association football midfielders
Association football defenders
Sportspeople from Bloemfontein
Mamelodi Sundowns F.C. players
Bloemfontein Celtic F.C. players
University of Pretoria F.C. players
Bidvest Wits F.C. players
South Africa international soccer players
2019 Africa Cup of Nations players
Soccer players from the Free State (province)
South Africa A' international soccer players
2014 African Nations Championship players